ITU country code may refer to:
 Country calling code E.164 - see List of country calling codes
 Mobile country code E.212
 ITU letter code for countries, see List of ITU letter codes

See also
 International Telecommunication Union
 ITU prefix
 Country code